Neohintonia is a genus of flowering plants in the tribe Eupatorieae within the family Asteraceae.

Species
The only known species is Neohintonia monantha, native to the States of Colima, Durango, Oaxaca, México, Jalisco, Nayarit, Sinaloa, Sonora, and Guerrero in western Mexico.

References

Endemic flora of Mexico
Eupatorieae
Monotypic Asteraceae genera